Acria is a moth genus of the superfamily Gelechioidea. It is placed in the family Depressariidae, which is often – particularly in older treatments – considered a subfamily of Oecophoridae or included in the Elachistidae.

Species
Acria amphorodes (Meyrick, 1923) (India)
Acria ceramitis Meyrick, 1908 (China, India, Korea, Japan)
Acria cocophaga Chen & Wu, 2011
Acria emarginella (Donovan, 1804) (China, India, Japan, Sri Lanka)
Acria equibicruris Wang, 2008 (China)
Acria eulectra Meyrick, 1908 (India)
Acria gossypiella (Shiraki, 1913)
Acria javanica Lvovsky, 2015
Acria malacolectra Meyrick, 1930
Acria meyricki Shashank, 2014 (India)
Acria nivalis Wang & Li, 2000 (China)
Acria obtusella (Walker, 1864) (Borneo, Sri Lanka)
Acria ornithorrhyncha Wang, 2008 (China)
Acria psamatholeuca Meyrick, 1930
Acria sciogramma Meyrick, 1915 (New Guinea)
Acria sulawesica Lvovsky, 2015
Acria xanthosaris Meyrick, 1908 (India)

References

http://ftp.funet.fi/index/Tree_of_life/insecta/lepidoptera/ditrysia/gelechioidea/depressariidae/acriinae/acria/ 
Yuan, Zhang, & Wang, 2008. Review of the Genus Acria Meyrick (Lepidoptera: Elachistidae, Depressariinae) from China. Acta Zootaxonomica Sinica Vol.33 No.4- p.685-690

 
Acriinae